The name Dean was used for five tropical cyclones in the Atlantic Ocean:
Tropical Storm Dean (1983), which struck the coast of Virginia, causing minor erosion and flooding
Hurricane Dean (1989), which passed over Bermuda, causing $10 million in damage and 16 injuries
Tropical Storm Dean (1995), which caused significant flooding damage to Chambers County, Texas, but 1 death
Tropical Storm Dean (2001), which caused $7.7 million in damage to Puerto Rico and minimal damage to the U.S. Virgin Islands
 Hurricane Dean (2007), a Cape-Verde hurricane that made landfall in the Yucatan Peninsula at Category 5 strength.

The name was retired after 2007, and was replaced by Dorian in the 2013 season. 

In the Southeastern Indian Ocean:
Cyclone Dean (1980), which struck Western Australia and caused substantial damage to Port Hedland

Atlantic hurricane set index articles
Australian region cyclone set index articles